Asura geminata is a moth of the  subfamily Arctiinae. It is found in New Pomerania (Papua New Guinea);.

References

Arctiinae